This is a list of settlements in Lancashire by population based on the results of the 2011 census. The next United Kingdom census will take place in 2021. In 2011, there were 49 built-up area subdivisions with 5,000 or more inhabitants in Lancashire, shown in the table below.

Population ranking 
The "settlements" in this table are the "Built-up area subdivisions" used by the Office for National Statistics in the 2011 United Kingdom census. "Built-up areas" and their subdivisions were previously known as "Urban areas" and are defined as areas of built-up land of at least 20 hectares which are separated from other built-up areas by at least 200m. They were named algorithmically, based on the name of a city, town or other settlement found on Ordnance Survey mapping within the area.  These areas do not always coincide with current or former local authority boundaries or other definitions of settlements: Bamber Bridge Built-up area subdivision, for example, had a 2011 population of 67,497 while the three electoral wards of Bamber Bridge East, Bamber Bridge North, and Bamber Bridge West had populations of 4,896, 4,665 and 4,384 respectively, totalling 13,945. Similarly, the town of Blackpool has a slightly higher population than its unitary authority, due to the urban subdivision including some small areas situated outside the district.

Historic Lancashire 

Historically, the county of Lancashire covered a much wider area before boundary changes were introduced in 1974. Some towns which formerly belonged to the county still strongly identify with it. Notable examples are Bolton, Bury, Heywood, Horwich, Leigh, Southport, St. Helens and Wigan, and as well as cities such as Manchester, Liverpool and Salford.

See also 

 Lancashire

References 

Lancashire-related lists
Populated places in Lancashire
Lancashire